Delroy Thompson (born 12 April 1965), better known by his stage name Pinchers, is a Jamaican reggae and dancehall artist.

He released one album as a teenager in Jamaica for Blue Trac Records, before moving to the UK in 1985.

In his career since 1985, Pinchers made his first hits in 1986 with "Borrow No Gun", which he released through King Jammy, "Abrakabra", "Eat Man", and "Jailhouse Hot". Pinchers gained fame with the single "Agony", from the album of the same name produced by King Jammy. In the same year, he recorded the Mass Out album, produced by Philip "Fatis" Burrell and backed by Sly & Robbie, Jackie Mittoo and Robbie Lyn, among others. In 1990, he had another hit, "Bandelero", which endures as probably his most remembered single and also released the songs "Carpenter", "Call Upon Mi God", and "Cross Them Bridge" in 1993.

In January 2015, he was among a group of men who were shot at in Queenborough, Jamaica; two men were killed and Thompson was hit in his left arm, breaking two bones.

Discography
Can't Take the Pressure (1986), Blue Trac Records/Blue Mountain Records 
Agony (1987), Live & Love
Mass Out (1987), Exterminator/Ras
Lift It Up Again (1987), Exterminator/Vena
Got to Be Me (1987), Live & Love
Dancehall Duo (1988), RAS - with Frankie Paul
Turbo Charge (1988), Super Supreme - with Frankie Paul
Pinchers with Pliers (1988), Black Scorpio - with Pliers
Return of the Don (1989), Supreme
Pinchers Meets Sanchez (1989), Exterminator - with Sanchez
Two Originals (1990), King Dragon - with Tweetie Bird
Hotter (1992), Blue Mountain
Dirt Low (1993), Exterminator/VP
If You Love Me Girl (1995), Trojan - with Frankie Paul
Get Close (2002), Artists Only

Compilation appearances
Worries and Problems (1986), Positive Musik - Pinchers, Scully Brown, Teddy Brown, Jah Wayne, Johnny P, Colourman and Little John

References

External links
 Pinchers Bio and Discography at reggae.ch
 

1965 births
Living people
Jamaican dancehall musicians
20th-century Jamaican male singers
Jamaican reggae singers
Jamaican expatriates in England
20th-century Black British male singers
VP Records artists